The Central District of Taft County is in Yazd province, Iran. At the National Census in 2006, its population was 30,826 in 9,330 households. The following census in 2011 counted 31,368 people in 9,864 households. At the latest census in 2016, the district had 32,454 inhabitants in 10,467 households.

References 

Taft County

Districts of Yazd Province

Populated places in Yazd Province

Populated places in Taft County